Scott McNeil is an Australian-born Canadian actor. He currently resides in Vancouver, British Columbia, Canada. One of the best-known Canadian voice actors of all time, McNeil has provided voices to many characters in animated shows, most notably Dragon Ball Z, Beast Wars: Transformers, X-Men: Evolution, Mobile Suit Gundam Wing, Inuyasha and Fullmetal Alchemist. He has done live action work as well.

Early life
McNeil was born in Brisbane, Australia, but moved to Vancouver, British Columbia, Canada when he was 4 years old in 1966.

He first appeared on stage at the age of three.

He first learned that people were paid to do different voices after a trip to Disneyland at the age of 12. That was when he learned that Paul Frees, the person who provided the voice that greeted visitors entering the Haunted Mansion, was the same person who provided the voice of the Pillsbury Doughboy.

Even though he knew about voice acting, McNeil pursued the theater. He studied at Studio 58. After leaving, he tried to find acting jobs and worked as an Elvis impersonator for a short time. It was in the late eighties when he found himself on his way into the world of voice acting. A casting director at the time told McNeil that he wished that he'd met him a week before when he was casting for the G.I. Joe cartoon.

Professional career
McNeil states his first role was providing voices on The New Adventures of He-Man. His first anime role was for Project A-ko, where he provided the voices for three women.

After appearing in a few films and two episodes of Highlander: The Series, he provided voices for Beast Wars, as Waspinator, Dinobot, Rattrap, and Silverbolt. He has described this as the work he is most proud of. On another fan favorite show, Dragon Ball Z, he was cast as the original voice of Piccolo and various other characters. He then provided the voice of Duo Maxwell on Mobile Suit Gundam Wing and Principal Kuno on Ranma ½. 

He eventually got the call stating he was cast as Wolverine on X-Men: Evolution. He continued to play the role of Logan/Wolverine for a total of four seasons from 2000 to 2003. McNeil was then cast in another fan favorite anime, Inuyasha as Kōga. He provided the voice of the Fullmetal Alchemist character Hohenheim of Light, Foghorn Leghorn on Baby Looney Tunes, Grumpy Bear on Care Bears: Adventures in Care-a-Lot, Amergan, Gregor and the lab director on Highlander: The Search for Vengeance, and Stork on Storm Hawks. He still appears in live action shows occasionally and was in Scooby-Doo 2: Monsters Unleashed and The Green Chain. As of October 2007, he estimates that he has provided voices to 8,500 characters.

McNeil is appreciative of fans because he knows what it is like to see your favorite voice actor talk as the character they provide the voice for. He says that he is inspired by Paul Frees, Maurice LaMarche, and Mel Blanc. If he had a chance to meet the late Mel Blanc, McNeil has said that he would "fan boy all over him."

Filmography

Japanese and Korean animation dubbing
 Adieu Galaxy Express 999 — Captain Harlock
 Beyblade Burst Evolution — Raul Comas (ep. 1-20)
 Black Lagoon — Verrocchio and Chinese Man
 Black Lagoon: The Second Barrage - Verrocchio
 A Chinese Ghost Story: The Tsui Hark Animation — Demon King and Solid Gold
 Dragon Ball Z — Piccolo, Majin Buu, Old Supreme Kai, Android 16, Dr. Brief, Jeice, Turtle, South Kai, Dabura, Killa, Mercenary Tao, Caroni, Farmer, King Piccolo and Mez (FUNimation-Saban dub and Westwood Media dub produced by Ocean Productions)
 Dragon Ball Z: Dead Zone — Piccolo (FUNimation-Pioneer dub)
 Dragon Ball Z: The Tree of Might — Piccolo and Daiz (1997 FUNimation-Saban TV dub)
 Dragon Ball Z: The Tree of Might — Piccolo, Daiz, Rasin and Oolong (1998 FUNimation-Pioneer video dub)
 Dragon Ball Z: The World's Strongest — Piccolo and Turtle (FUNimation-Pioneer dub)
 Dragon Drive — Saizou Toki and Magna
 Dragon Warrior — General Rudolph
 Elemental Gelade — Beazon
 Fullmetal Alchemist — Hohenheim of Light
 Fullmetal Alchemist the Movie: Conqueror of Shamballa — Hohenheim of Light
 Galaxy Express 999 — Captain Harlock
 Hakkenden: Legend of the Dog Warriors — Hachiro T. Kanamari and Motofuji Hikita
 Hello Carbot — Dandy
 Hamtaro — Ichiro Yamada and Chairman Inatori
 Highlander: The Search for Vengeance — Amergan, Gregor and Lab Director
 Inuyasha — Kōga, Bird of Paradise leader (right), Taigokumaru, Tsukuyomaru (Ep. 74), Panther King, Elderly Wolf, Weasel Demon, Tsubaki's master, Unnamed priest (Kagura's puppet), O-Yakata, Ogres: Sesshomaru's Ogre, Ogre of the Forbidden Tower, Undead ogre
 Inuyasha: The Final Act — Kōga, Meiōjū
 Jin-Roh: The Wolf Brigade
 Let's Go Quintuplets — Father
 Master Keaton — Colonel Fox, Walter, Priest, Resistance Member, Morris and Adult Student
 Master Keaton (OVA version) — Colonel Fox and Morris
 MegaMan NT Warrior — Guts Man, Cut Man, Tora and King Man
 MegaMan NT Warrior: Axess — Shade Man, Savage Man and Guts Man
 Mega Man: Upon a Star — Dr. Wily and Beat
 Mix Master — Prince Brad, Mayor Charles, Motabi, Pirostar, Ajakdevil and Twistunga
 Mobile Suit Gundam — Teniente Reed
 Mobile Suit Gundam: Char's Counterattack — Londo Bell Technician, Lyle and Shuttle Pilot
 Mobile Suit Gundam 00 — Ali Al-Saachez, Daryl Dodge, Captain, Kinue's Boss, Kinue's Staff and Vice Minister of Foreign Affairs
 Mobile Suit Gundam SEED — Captain Koopman, Gerard Garcia and Kojiro Murdoch
 Mobile Suit Gundam SEED Destiny — Unato Ema Seiran, Glasgow
 Mobile Suit Gundam Wing — Duo Maxwell and Old Man
 Monster Rancher — Suezo, Gally, Gray Wolf, Naga and Captain Black Dino
 Night Warriors: Darkstalkers' Revenge — Lord Raptor
 One Piece — Shiki (Episode 429, Funimation dub)
 One Piece Film: Strong World — Shiki
 Powerpuff Girls Z — Fuzzy Lumpkins, Emo Hendrix and Giant Panda-Mask
 Project A-ko 2: Plot of the Daitokuji Financial Group — Captain Napolipolita and Kei Yuki
 Ranma ½ — Principal Kuno, Daitokuji Kimiyasu and Ushinnosuke Oshamanbe
 Saber Marionette J — Rinzo
 Sanctuary — Tokai
 Samurai 7 — Tanomo
 Shakugan No Shana — Orgon
 Sleeping Beauty
 Sword of the Stranger — Luo Lang
 The Story of Saiunkoku — Official Wa and Seikan Gang Boss
 Tico of the Seven Seas
 Transformers: Armada — Jetfire
 Transformers: Cybertron — Backstop and Snarl
 Transformers: Energon — Jetfire, Strongarm, Omega Supreme and Autobot Guard
 Tobot — Tobot W
 Ultimate Teacher — Ganbachai Chabane and Umekichi
 The Vision of Escaflowne — Jajuka and King Aston (Ocean/Bandai dub)
 Zoids: Fuzors — Reynard, Vareth and Male TV Announcer
 Zoids: New Century Zero — Stigma Stoeller and Major Polta

Film

Western animation roles
 1001 Nights — Maymoon
 3 Friends and Jerry — Principal
 Aaagh! It's the Mr. Hell Show! — Carlos, Elf, Jimmy Stewart, Ostrich, Fish Agent, Interviewed Bystander and Dorian Gray
 Action Man — Additional Voices
 Action Man: X Mission– The Movie — Gangrene, X-Robot 312 and Commando 1
 Adventures of Sonic the Hedgehog — MacHopper
 Animated Classic Showcase — Various characters
 Ark — Quinn
 Asterix and Obelix: Mansion of the Gods — Goth
 A Tale of Two Kitties — Chester, Buster, Mouse and Cuckoo Clock Bird
 Baby Looney Tunes — Baby Foghorn
 Barbie: Fairytopia — Ruby
 Barbie and the Diamond Castle — Troll
 Barbie in A Mermaid Tale — Syrenka's Pet Fish
 Barbie of Swan Lake — Peddler
 Beast Machines — Rattrap, Silverbolt and Waspinator
 Beast Wars — Rattrap, Dinobot, Waspinator, Silverbolt, Dinobot Clone, Cicadacon and Transmetal Dinobot
 Being Ian — TV Commercial Guy, Announcer (1), Gym Teacher, Ricky, Soldier, Police Officer, Announcer (2), Mr. Begley and Passenger 4
 Ben Hur — Jesus Christ, Number 59 and Art Instructor
 Billy the Cat — Blackie's Henchcat #2
 Bob the Builder (2015)
 Broken Saints — Mars, Osama
 Bucky O'Hare and the Toad Wars — Dexter, Frax, Sly Leezard, Deadeye Duck and Digger McSquint
 Camelot: The Legend — Lancelot and Bruce
 Capertown Cops — Mayor Kickback
 Care Bears: Adventures in Care-a-Lot — Grumpy Bear, Grumpy Bear 2 and Grumpy Bear 3
 Care Bears: The Giving Festival — Grumpy Bear
 Care Bears: Share Bear Shines — Grumpy Bear
 Care Bears: To the Rescue — Grumpy Bear
 Christopher the Christmas Tree - Additional Voices
 Class of the Titans — Atlas and Antaeus
 Coconut Fred's Fruit Salad Island — Mr. Eyeball
 Conan the Adventurer — Wrath-Amon, Zula, Ram-Amon, Misha, Yin Doo
 D'Myna Leagues — Jackie Mungo, Big Tree Powell and Sheriff Hamhock
 Dinobabies — Dak and Trip-taking Dinosaur 2
 Dinotrux — Split the Ankylodump
 Dog City — Sherlock Bones
 Donner — Elf DJ, Oiled Elf, Vocal Coach, Tubby and Brock
 Dragon Booster — Cain
 Dragon Tales — Captain Scallywag, Speedy, Sid Sycamore, Arlo and Green Hat Mefirst Wizard Head
 Edgar & Ellen — Grandfather
 Exchange Student Zero — Lionel, Headmaster and King Karuta
 Exosquad — Additional Voices
 Extreme Dinosaurs — T-Bone
 Fantastic Four: World's Greatest Heroes — Annihilus
 Fat Dog Mendoza — Bus Driver, Old Man on Sidewalk, Purple Haired Alien, Matthews and Handyman
 Firehouse Tales — Additional Voices
 Funky Fables — Misc. Characters
 Generation O! — Nub
 George of the Jungle — Beefy Ape
 Geronimo Stilton — Professor Cheeseweel, William Shortpaws, Franz Ravenrat and Professor Hier O'Glyph
 G.I. Joe: A Real American Hero — Cobra Commander, Freefall, Lt. Falcon, Skymate, Storm Shadow, Headman, Interrogator and Various Cobra Troopers
 G.I. Joe Extreme — Cobra Commander
 G.I. Joe: Sgt. Savage and His Screaming Eagles — Sgt. Savage and Cobra Commander
 G.I. Joe: Valor vs. Venom — Destro, Gung-Ho and B.A.T
 Goodtimes Fairy Tales
 Happy the Littlest Bunny
 He-Man and the Masters of the Universe — Mer-Man, Beast Man, Stratos, Ram-Man, Clawful, Kobra Khan and Calix
 Hero: 108 - Hurricane Lee, Twin Masters, Stingray King, Commander of Darkness (Season 2), Bartley and Beetle King
 Heroes on Hot Wheels — Steve Warson, Bob Cramer, various
 Hot Wheels Battle Force 5 — Grimian, Master Takeyasu, Tromp and Bruterax
 Hot Wheels Highway 35 World Race — Rekkas, Dan Dresden
 Hulk Vs — Additional Voices
 Hurricanes — Cal Casey and Genghis Khan
 Johnny Test — Mitchell "Bumper" Randalls, Mr. White, Zizrar, White Rook, Black Bishop, Kirk Kirkland, Bumper's Dad, Bishop, Rook, Mutant Agent 2 and Man
 Kid vs. Kat — Agent Fudge Ripple
 King Arthur and the Knights of Justice — Sir Lancelot, Sir Tone, Warlord Blackwing and Warlord Axe
 Kong: The Animated Series — Tan, Omar and Kong
 Krypto the Superdog — Ace, Ignatius and various characters
 Little Red Riding Hood — Wolf
 League of Super Evil — Voltar, Rock Gothlington, Destrucktor, Mayor, Old Man Jenkins, Fiyero Flambe, Freckled Kid, Trooper, Night Shade, Globulous, Camera Operator, Citizen 1, Neighbor Woman 1, Friendly Pa, Happy Citizen, Man 3, Citizen 3, Kinder Kreep, Henchbot Elite, SWEAT Soldier, Mr. Nelson, Military Scientist, Gynorman Guard, Voltar Clone, Herb Geezler, Mrs. Bandango, Veterinarian, Mal, Commodore, White Knight, Blecch, Bolkar, Evilly Awards Announcer, Shushizilla, Shangri-Lava PA, Queen Ant, Changemorphers Commercial Announcer, Sophisticated Dream Rabbit, Dance-o-rama Announcer, Nanny Bot, Puppy, Skullossus Admiral and Seymour Sweat
 Lego Ninjago: Masters of Spinjitzu — Karlof, Overlord, Arcturus, Stone Warrior and Clouse
 Littlest Pet Shop — Additional Voices
 Madeline — Additional Voices
 Martha Speaks — Computer Folder
 Martin Mystery — You do Voodoo
 Mary-Kate and Ashley in Action!- Dr Willy
 Max Steel — Klean Kal
 Max Steel: Countdown — Elementor
 Max Steel: Forces of Nature — Elementor
 Mega Man — Dr. Wily, Proto Man and Eddie
 Monkey Magic — Lord Refang, Milesight, Guardian and South General
 Monster Mash — Wolf
 ¡Mucha Lucha! — Heavy Traffic, Sr. Hasbeena, Francisco of The Forest and Minotoro
 Mummies Alive! — Rath, Set and Bob
 My Little Pony: Best Gift Ever — Flam
 My Little Pony: Friendship Is Magic — Flam, Rover, Chief Thunderhooves and Black Stone
 My Little Pony: Pony Life — Flam
 My Scene: Jammin' in Jamaica — Russell Bostick and Fortune Star Guy
 NASCAR Racers — Lyle "The Collector" Owens
 Ninjago: Masters of Spinjitzu — Overlord, Nadakhan, Clouse, and Karloff
 Pac-Man and the Ghostly Adventures — Additional Voices
 Pirate Express — Hades
 Pucca — Lazlo Gazlodivich, Ruby's Dad, Texas Lugie, Yuni, Ice Cream Man, Shaman
 ReBoot — Hack (rest of Season 2 and Season 3), Specky, Mr. Andrew, Roller-blading Binome, Fax Modem, Binome 3, Jean-Luc Binome (some episodes), Viral Binome 1, Saucy Mare Pirate 5, Mainframe CPU Officer 3, Guardian Bob Actor (Glitch Bob Actor), Enzo Actor, Megabyte Actor, Hack Actor, Slash Actor, Captain Capacitor Actor, Mechanic Binome, Dr. Frankenome, Viral Commander, Ash Williams User, Zombie Binome 2, Deer Head, Prospector Binome, Punk Binome, Barry, Praying Mantis Virus, Jury Guy 2, Desert Port CPU Officer 2 and Scientist Binome
 ReBoot: Daemon Rising — Hack
 ReBoot: My Two Bobs — Hack
 Ricky Sprocket: Showbiz Boy — Mr. Fischburger
 Robin and the Dreamweavers — Sass, Short Goon, Booth and Black-haired Punk
 RoboCop: Alpha Commando — Additional Voices
 RollBots — Lance
 Roswell Conspiracies: Aliens, Myths and Legends — Ruck
 Rudolph the Red-Nosed Reindeer and the Island of Misfit Toys — Hermey, Yukon Cornelius, Coach Comet, Duck and Boomerang
 Sabrina: The Animated Series — Additional Voices
 Santa Mouse and the Ratdeer — Loopy
 Salty's Lighthouse — Zorran, Zak, Zug, Bluenose, Boomer, and Fultan Ferry
 Shadow Raiders — Pelvus and Blokk
 Sherlock Holmes in the 22nd Century — Additional Voices
 Shezow — Mark Monroe and Wildtiger
 Sitting Ducks — Arnold the Alligator
 Slugterra — Mr. Saturday, Howard and André Geyser
 Spider-Man Unlimited — Vulture and Man-Wolf
 Stone Protectors
 Storm Hawks — Stork, Repton, Leugey, Advisor, Harrier, Steward, Blister, Arygyn, King Agar, Project Commander, Walder, Eyeball, Tritonn, Davey Digger and Rinjiin
 Strawberry Shortcake's Berry Bitty Adventures — Postmaster Bee, Clem Cricket and Berrykin Ed
 Supernoobs — Mr. Roachmont, General Blorgon, Market Clerk, Wolf Player, Store Clerk and The Cornbury Mayor
 Sushi Pack — Wasabi Pow and Fugu
 The Adventures of Corduroy — Stinky Fungus
 The Adventures of Mowgli — Shere Khan
 The Adventures of T-Rex — Bubba, Addar and Truck-driving Dinosaur 2
 The Baby Huey Show — Additional Voices
 The Christmas Orange — Lenny the Elf Foreman
 The Condor — Dogg
 The Cramp Twins — Turnip Shoot, Rawhide Bear, Volcal Voices
 The Deep — Captain Chadwick and Bruce
 The Fearless Four — Manager, 2nd Assistant, Hunter #1, The Raccording Director, Guard #1
 The Princess Twins of Legendale — Cassi, Lettam, Jibber, Henchman
 The Little Prince — Captain 
 The New Adventures of He-Man — Butthead, Captain Zang, Krex and Flipshot
 The Ten Commandments — Seti
 The Twisted Whiskers Show — Goosers, Von Ripper, Yawp, Dine, Gasper, Ird and Sinister Squirrel
 Underground Ernie - Mr Rails, Bakerloo, additional voices (US dub)
 The Wacky World of Tex Avery — Amanda Banshee
 Timothy Tweedle: The First Christmas Elf — Muffin
 Tom and Jerry Tales — Uncle Pecos
 Troll Tales — Flobbergob the troll
 Vor-Tech: Undercover Conversion Squad — Stinger and The Car
 Weird-Oh's — Daddy-O Chassis, Davey and Killer McBash
 Where My Dogs At? — Russell Crowe and Joel Madden (uncredited)
 Wolverine: Weapon X — Deathlok Prime, Deathloks, Agent #1, Civilian #2, The Thing, Matthew K. Edwards
 X-Men: Evolution — Wolverine
 Yakkity Yak — Professor Crazyhair
 Zixx — General Ghost
 The Zula Patrol — Additional Voices

Live-action roles
 The Commish — Jeff Surnac
 Crackerjack — Rex
 Damage — Chip
 The Flash — Julius (Season 1, Episode 12)
 The Green Chain — Ben Holm
 The Guard — Pony
 Highlander: The Series — Dennis, Robert McLeod
 Hope Island — Dee-Dee and Barnabus
 I Was a Teenage Faust — Temptor
 Neon Rider — Photographer
 Ninja Turtles: The Next Mutation — Simon Bonesteel
 Outer Limits — Astronaut and Dino (voice) 
 Psych — Rip
 The Ranch — Douglas
 Riverdale — Gerald "Tall Boy" Petite
 Sanctuary — Birot
 Scooby-Doo 2: Monsters Unleashed — Evil Masked Figure
 The Sentinel — Lane Cassidy
 Sleeping Dogs — Harry Maxwell
 Sleeping with Strangers — Todd Warren
 Stargate SG-1 — Kefflin, Townsperson
 Strange Frequency — Robbie Laine
 Street Justice — Crackhouse Junkie
 Supernatural — Benny Sutton
 Tasmanian Devils — Whitfield
 12 Hours to Live — Victor Kirk
 Viper — Judd
 Warriors of Virtue — Yun (Voice)
 Woody Woodpecker — Nate Grimes

Video games
 Barbie Horse Adventures: Riding Camp — Jake Lockwood and Fisherman Bob
 Crypt of the Necrodancer — Eli
 Def Jam: Fight for NY — Hero (Cocky)
 Dead Rising 2 — Antoine Thomas, Big Earl Flaherty, Survivor 16 and Merc 4
 Dead Rising 2: Off the Record — Antoine Thomas, Big Earl Flaherty, Survivor 16 and Merc 4
 Dungeons and Dragons Online — Dungeon Master and Narrator
 Dynasty Warriors: Gundam 2 — Soldier and Gym Gingham
 Dynasty Warriors: Gundam 3 — Gym Gingham and Duo Maxwell
 Far Cry 5 — Additional Voices
 Frogger: Ancient Shadow — Finnius and Lumpy
 Frogger Beyond — Lumpy and Hi-Tech Elder
 Frogger's Adventures: The Rescue — Lumpy and Dr. Frog
 George of the Jungle and the Search for the Secret - Slappy
 The Godfather: The Game — Trojan
 He-Man: Defender of Grayskull — Beast Man
 Inuyasha: A Feudal Fairy Tale — Kōga
 Inuyasha: The Secret of the Cursed Mask — Kōga
Inuyasha: Feudal Combat – Kōga
 Mobile Suit Gundam: Encounters in Space — Luce Kassel
 Need For Speed: Heat'''  - Police Officer 
 ReBoot — Hack, Binome 3, Mainframe CPU Officer and Charlton Heston Binome
 Scooby-Doo 2: Monsters Unleashed: The Video Game — Evil Masked Figure
 Tooth and Tail — Archimedes
 Transformers: Beast Wars Transmetals — Rattrap, Silverbolt and Waspinator
 Under the Skin — Carlos Oliveira, Young Man, Pickpocket, Karate Champ, Yuppie, Cosmi Sr. and Old Man
 Warhammer 40,000: Dawn of War — Lord Bale, Space Marine Sergeant Mattias, Daemon Prince, Sindri Myr, Matiel and Servitors
 Warhammer 40,000: Dawn of War – Winter Assault — Chaplain Varnus, Imperial Guardsmen, Heavy Weapons Platoons, Kasrkin Squad, Ogryns, Chimeras, Sentinels, Hellhounds, Basilisks and Baneblades
 Warhammer 40,000: Dawn of War – Dark Crusade — Davian Thule, Gregor Vash
 Warhammer 40,000: Dawn of War – Soulstorm — Basically everyone
 Warhammer 40,000: Dawn of War II – Chaos Rising — Chaos Sorcerers
 Warhammer 40,000: Dawn of War II – Retribution — Neroth and Sergeant Merrick
 World of Warcraft: Warlords of Draenor — Durotan
 Ys: The Ark of Napishtim — Raba, Mannan, Toksa, Ryug, Cloa, Emilio, Mikhail and Naphishtim

Commercials
 Kids' WB'' — Sr. Hasbeena, Wolverine

References

External links

A3U Podcast Audio Interview With Scott

Living people
Australian emigrants to Canada
Australian male film actors
Australian male television actors
Australian male video game actors
Australian male voice actors
Canadian male film actors
Canadian male television actors
Canadian male video game actors
Canadian male voice actors
Australian people of Scottish descent
Canadian people of Scottish descent
Male actors from Brisbane
Male actors from Vancouver
Naturalized citizens of Canada
Studio 58 people
Year of birth missing (living people)
20th-century Australian male actors
21st-century Australian male actors
20th-century Canadian male actors
21st-century Canadian male actors